Bryant Hill Cemetery is a historic cemetery located at Ellicottville in Cattaraugus County, New York. In 1821, Samuel Bryant set aside land to serve as the first cemetery at Ellicottville; the first burial was in 1824 and the last in 1901. Restoration of the cemetery began in 1970, and it became the property of the town of Ellicottville in 1976. It is the final resting site for many of the area's early New England settlers.

It was listed on the National Register of Historic Places in 2003.

References

External links
 
 Bryant Hill Cemetery, Compiled by: L.V. Siggelkow (Aug. 1974); also records from Edna Bryant Cole
 Historical marker/historic landmark for Bryant Hill Cemetery in Ellicottville, NY

Cemeteries on the National Register of Historic Places in New York (state)
1821 establishments in New York (state)
Cemeteries in Cattaraugus County, New York
National Register of Historic Places in Cattaraugus County, New York